Bhogavalli Venkata Sathyanarayana Prasad is an Indian film distributor and producer known for his works in Telugu cinema. He owns the film production company Sri Venkateswara Cine Chitra. He has won two Filmfare Awards and a SIIMA Telugu award as producer for the films Attarintiki Daredi and Magadheera.

Film career
In 1984, Prasad was associated with film distribution alongside, film journalist Pasupuleti Rama Rao. He ventured into film production In 1986, with Driver Babu a film directed by Boyina Subba Rao, starring Sobhan Babu.

Selected filmography
As distributor and producer 
Sahasam (2013); producer
Attarintiki Daredi (2013); producer
Dohchay (2015); Producer
Magadheera (2009); co-producer
Manoharam (2000)
Adhirindi Alludu (1991)
Dagudu Moothala Dampathyam (1990)
Ontari Poratam (1989)
Kutra Pathrikai (1988)
Jeevana Tharangam (1988)
Chattamtho Chadharangam (1987)
Makutam Leni Maharaju (1986)
Driver Babu (1986)

Film Production
Sri Venkateswara Cine Chitra

Awards
 Filmfare Award for Best Film - Telugu - Attarintiki Daredi (2013) & Magadheera (2009)
B. Nagi Reddy Best Wholesome Family Entertainer - Attarintiki Daredi (2013)
SIIMA Award for Best Film - Telugu - Attarintiki Daredi (2013)

References

External links

Telugu film producers
Living people
Year of birth missing (living people)
Film producers from Andhra Pradesh